Kis, Kış or Kiš, is a surname. Notable persons with that surname include:
 Andriy Kis (born 1982), Ukrainian Olympic luger
 Cássia Kis (born 1958), Brazilian actress
 Danilo Kiš (1935–1989), Serbian writer
 Gergő Kis (born 1988), Hungarian Olympic swimmer
 Ivana Kiš (born 1979), Croatian composer
 János Kis (born 1943), Hungarian politician
 Tevfik Kış (born 1934), Turkish Olympic wrestler